Kouyaté is a surname common in Senegal, Guinea, Mali. Notable people with the surname include:

 Adama Kouyaté, Malian photographer
 Bassekou Kouyate, Malian musician
 Boubakar Kouyaté, Malian footballer
 Cheikhou Kouyaté, Senegalese footballer
 Kandia Kouyaté, Malian jelimuso (a female griot) and kora player
 Lansana Kouyaté, Prime Minister of Guinea from 2007 to 2008
 Mamadou Kouyaté, Malian footballer
 Moussa Kouyate, Malian kora player
 Moustapha Kouyaté, Guinean footballer
 Soriba Kouyaté, Senegalese kora player
 Sotigui Kouyaté,  Malian-Burkinabé actor and footballer

Surnames